Mega Man, known as  in Japan, is the title character and the protagonist of the Mega Man series by Capcom. He was created by Akira Kitamura for the first Mega Man game released in 1987, with artist Keiji Inafune providing detailed character artwork based on Kitamura's pixel art design.

Mega Man has become one of Capcom's mascots, one of the company's primary original characters, and continues to be one of the video game industry's most recognizable icons. Having appeared on many consoles since the Nintendo Entertainment System, Mega Man has had a wide gaming audience. Mega Man's fictional universe can be divided into seven categories, each featuring different variations and incarnations of a robot boy hero. Although "Mega Man", or "Rockman", is usually the name for the original Mega Man from the classic series, it can also be the Mega Man series of fictional works, or the group of adherently named main characters within.

The several spin-off series that have emerged over the past years, each one continuing the Mega Man storyline in some unique way, includes but is not limited to the Mega Man X, Mega Man Legends, Mega Man Battle Network, and  Mega Man Star Force series. Mega Man has also appeared as a playable character in the Super Smash Bros. series. A resulting animated series was also produced originally in Japan as well as a number of toys, comics, and collectables available both in and outside Japan.

Mega Man's role in the original story was to be an assistant to his creator Dr. Light. When Light's colleague goes mad, Dr. Light repurposes Mega Man to battle the mad scientist Dr. Wily and his ever-growing army of robots, and stop them from taking over the planet by using their own special abilities against them. Utilizing his Mega Buster arm cannon and his ability to copy the special weapons of the boss robots he defeats, Mega Man must travel the world and traverse harsh environments in order to bring Wily's menace to an end. With the help of his creator Dr. Light and his assorted cybernetic companions, Mega Man's eventual goal is to one day achieve everlasting peace for both humans and robots.

Conception and design
Although originally the names "Mighty Kid", "Knuckle Kid", and "Rainbow Battle Kid" were proposed, Capcom eventually settled on "Rockman" as Mega Man's Japanese moniker. The word "Rock" in Rockman is a reference to the music genre rock and roll, and is meant to work in tandem with his sister robot, Roll. However, Capcom Consumer Products Division president Joe Morici changed the name from Rockman to Mega Man because he felt "The title was horrible." In addition, the original Mega Man titles intentionally incorporated a "Rock, Paper, Scissors" gameplay mechanic into defeating certain enemies. The pixel art for the character was created by the designer of the original game in the series, Akira Kitamura (credited under the pseudonym "A.K"), and later turned into a refined illustration by Keiji Inafune. Kitamura originally intended Mega Man to be colored white, but instead settled on blue to make his animations more clear. Mega Man's design had a lot of little influences from various manga, anime, and tokusatsu shows, specifically Ninja Captor. Nobuyuki Matsushima, lead programmer for the original game, came up with the idea for Mega Man changing colors when his weapons changed.

During a special event at TGS 2007, Inafune commented on the creation of Mega Man. "I'm often called the father of Mega Man, but actually, his design was already created when I joined Capcom," he explained. "My mentor (Capcom senior member Akira Kitamura), who was the designer of the original Mega Man, had a basic concept of what Mega Man was supposed to look like. So I only did half of the job in creating him. I didn't get to completely design a Mega Man [protagonist] from scratch until Zero (Mega Man X, SNES). Back when the SNES was coming out, I was asked to give Mega Man a redesign, so I created this character. But I realized that this design wouldn't be accepted as Mega Man, so I had another designer create the new Mega Man, and I worked on Zero to release him as the 'other main character' that would steal all the good scenes!"

The team decided to incorporate anime elements for the game's animation. Inafune explained, "[Mega Man's] hand transforms into a gun and you can actually see it come out of his arm. We wanted to make sure that the animation and the motion was realistic and actually made sense. So with Mega Man, we had this perfect blending of game character with animation ideas." Across the series Mega Man was given new skills to add more variety to the gameplay. For Mega Man 6, after having implemented so many different mechanics to the gameplay of past entries, Inafune thought that Rush adapter assembly was inevitable. The artist struggled with the adaptor designs and ultimately found them to be unrealistic. According to Inafune, "If you think about it, they shouldn't be able to combine like this. It would be awkward if parts of Rush like his neck were left over after they combined, so what was I supposed to do?"

In the cover of the North American copies, Mega Man's appearance greatly differs from his original one. Veteran video game cover illustrator Marc Ericksen painted the North American box art of Mega Man 2, which included Mega Man firing a pistol instead of his trademark Mega Buster. Ericksen explained, "I didn't know anything about Mega Man, and [after looking at the character in action] I said to the art director, 'What is he shooting with?' ... He said, 'Well, he must have a pistol, because I don't see a rifle.' ... I said, 'So, a pistol? Do you want me to do a pistol?' And he said, 'Yeah, let's put a pistol in there.' So I did what I was told and I put the pistol in there. Add to the fact that they only had, like, a day and a half for me to do the painting and what you wound up with was not the greatest result. But certainly a result that was not my fault. I mean, they told me to put the pistol in his hand!"

Appearances

In Mega Man video games

Mega Man's most notable appearances have been within his own self-titled games, beginning with Rockman for the Family Computer in 1987. This, and all future Mega Man games released in North America and Europe, would bear the title "Mega Man" due to Capcom USA's early decision to change the name. Prior to decision on the name "Mega Man" which was proposed by Joseph Morici, Capcom had even considered the name "Rainbow Man" as a possible title due to the nature of Mega Man's color change when using different Robot Master weapons.

Nearly all of the classic series Mega Man titles have been two-dimensional sidescrollers involving horizontal movement through various levels. This mechanic continues even on titles developed for high performance platforms, such as the Sony PSP release of Mega Man Powered Up, which features 3D graphics, yet movement to both the background and foreground is restricted.  The main series on both the NES and Nintendo Game Boy would follow this approach in the design of every game developed on those systems, and set the standard for all platformer Mega Man games to come. Mega Man himself has evolved very little cosmetically since his initial release, but has often been given new techniques in each game. The New Mega Buster, for instance, which was introduced in Mega Man 4, allowed him to charge up a shot. The slide was introduced in Mega Man 3. It was these
which were needed in order to help him exceed any new challenges added by the level designers. In Mega Man 9 and 10, Mega Man's abilities were restricted back to that of the original game. However, Mega Man can charge his shots again in Mega Man 11, and he gained the ability to increase its power and speed with the Double Gear System.

Capcom, recognizing Mega Man's versatility, has placed him in several different video game genres outside of his usual series. He has since been seen as a sports star in the Super NES game Mega Man Soccer, a race car driver in Mega Man Battle & Chase, and a board game piece in Wily and Right's RockBoard. A limited release arcade fighting game series containing Mega Man: The Power Battle and Mega Man 2: The Power Fighters pitted Mega Man against several boss characters from his original series.

Though Capcom owns the rights to all Mega Man games and has been responsible for the development of all of his console titles, it has in the past licensed the Mega Man character to other companies for PC releases.  Mega Man and Mega Man III  were not ports of the NES games of the same name, but significantly different original games, and were developed by the US-based Hi Tech Expressions. The Mega Man game on the Game Gear was published by Sega. Rockman Strategy was developed and released exclusively in China by AcerTWP.

Mega Man was to have appeared in several iterations in the canceled Mega Man Universe. These included a redesigned Mega Man simply called 'Mega Man', the classic Keiji Inafune styled Mega Man referred to as 'Rock Man', and 'Bad Box Art Mega Man', who was based on the box-art featured on the North American version of the original Mega Man game. An updated version of the latter iteration, now sporting a noticeable round stomach, appeared as a playable character in the PlayStation 3 and PlayStation Vita versions of Street Fighter X Tekken.

In other games

Mega Man has made appearances in several game projects outside of his original series. He appears as a playable character in Marvel vs. Capcom and Marvel vs. Capcom 2 assisted by Rush and Beat as a representative of the Capcom brand. Mega Man makes another fighting game appearance in Street Fighter X Tekken but as an aged, obese depiction of the character on the North American box art of Mega Man, complete with pistol. Here he has the name "Mega Man" even in the Japanese version.

Mega Man also appears a special playable guest character in Nintendo's Super Smash Bros. for Nintendo 3DS and Wii U and Super Smash Bros. Ultimate. He is a very unorthodox character, as his moveset, animations, movement and playstyle are almost completely based upon the gameplay and graphical style of the original Mega Man games. He relies much more on ranged projectiles than he does on physical combat, and he utilizes abilities copied from various Robot Masters.

He has also been featured in the 3D shooter Cannon Spike, the collectible card game simulators SNK vs. Capcom: Card Fighters Clash and Card Fighter 2: Expand Edition.

Non-playable cameo appearances by Mega Man occur most often in other Capcom licensed games, and he's often seen as a background character. Such appearances include Capcom World 2, Street Fighter Alpha 3, Marvel Super Heroes vs. Street Fighter, Pocket Fighter, Mighty Final Fight, Power Stone 2, Boktai, Boktai 2, Lunar Knights, The Misadventures of Tron Bonne, Onimusha Blade Warriors, and Tatsunoko vs. Capcom: Ultimate All Stars. Animated incarnations of Mega Man were common in the early 1990s, particularly in North America.

Mega Man appeared in a crossover event in Dragalia Lost called “Mega Man Chaos Protocol, where Dr. Wily had transported to the Dragalia Lost world and used technology to mind control the Dragons Brunhilda, Mercury, Jupiter, Midgardsomr and Zodiark and Mega Man has to help Prince Euden and his team save them. During the event, Mega Man could be obtained as a character in the gacha. As a playable character, Mega Man is a Wand type Attack Unit character of the Fire element who like most characters has his own Dragon known as Rush, who is from the actual Mega Man series.

In other media
His first animated appearance was as a main character in the series Captain N: The Game Master, which features a myriad of characters that had appeared on Nintendo consoles up until that time. They all aid the title character, Captain N, in his quest to save the world of Videoland, encountering many villains, including Mega Man's own enemy Dr. Wily. Mega Man is voiced in this series by Doug Parker, and his character had a tendency to add the prefix "mega-" to words for emphasis. He also appeared in the animated Mega Man TV series, in which he is voiced by Ian James Corlett.

A three-episode Japanese anime OVA titled Mega Man: Upon a Star was produced in 1993 in an attempt to help spread information on Japanese culture. In it, Mega Man crosses paths with his adversary, Dr. Wily, while learning various facts about Japanese society, and receiving occasional help from Proto Man.

The story of Mega Man's origin and his bittersweet victory over the robotic forces of Dr. Wily has been adapted by The Protomen, a band from Tennessee who perform an original dystopian rock opera based on the dynamic between Mega Man and Proto Man. During the show, the band members wear costumes inspired by their take on the series, including motorcycle helmets with built-in microphones fashioned to look like those of Mega Man and Proto Man, and the iconic arm-blaster.

MegaRan performs a number of rap songs about Mega Man.

In May 2010, a live action full feature film was released directed by Eddie Lebron.  The film using a mix of CGI and people in extreme sport equipment for the fighting robots based itself on the first game with slight modifications to the story and character designs to work.  The film can currently be viewed for free at its own website.

Mega Man is referenced in Super Meat Boy Forever by a playable character known as Mega Bandage, where the character Bandage Girl is dressed like Mega Man. She is obtained by completing a Cursed Warp Zone where she must fight the main villain Dr. Fetus in a battle similar to bosses in Mega Man, where she must shoot her blaster while dodging the buzzsaws, as since she in the fight only has 1 HP, she would die in one hit.

Archie Comics
In April 2011, Archie Comics released their first issue in an ongoing series of licensed comics based on the Mega Man franchise which features the titular character going against his nemesis Dr. Wily in various, original story arcs. The overall concept is created and almost exclusively written by Ian Flynn, who is also the current head writer for Archie Comics' other video game licensed comic series Sonic the Hedgehog. Consequently, as of May 2013, both series have been crossed-over in a major story arc called "Worlds Collide", which spans twelve issues between the Mega Man comics, the main Sonic the Hedgehog comics, and the latter's side-series Sonic Universe. The popularity of this crossover is such that another meeting of the two series, "Worlds Unite", was announced for spring of 2015.

Reception and legacy

Overall, the character of Mega Man has been well received by critics. IGN called him an icon of Capcom. Nintendo Power listed Mega Man as their fourth favourite hero, citing his ability to steal weapons from downed Robot Masters. Mega Man was also listed as the best robot in video games by many sources such Joystick Division, UGO Networks, and Complex. GameDaily ranked him as the best Capcom character of all time. UGO Networks listed Mega Man as one of their best heroes of all time, and called him "one of the most iconic video game heroes of all time". He was included in GameSpot's "All Time Greatest Video Game Hero" contest and reached the "Elite Eight" round before losing to Mario. In a Famitsu poll done in February 2010, Mega Man was voted by readers as the twenty-second most popular video game character. The 2011 Guinness World Records Gamer's Edition lists Mega Man as the 23rd most popular video game character. In 2012, GamesRadar ranked him as the 12th "most memorable, influential, and badass" protagonist in games.

Complex ranked him as having the tenth best fighting game cameos for his guest appearances in Street Fighter X Tekken in 2012. Joystick Division cited his rivalry with Dr. Wily as seventh of the ten greatest in video games, adding giving "great credit to this rivalry for its open-endedness" and GamesRadar listed him and Proto Man as having one of the best brotherly rivalries in gaming. UGO Networks have placed Mega Man as the eighth character who most deserves his own movie.

1UP.com described Mega Man as "Capcom's ill-treated mascot", and "one of the most incongruous characters of all time", saying "it wouldn't be completely incorrect to assume that the popularity of the series has almost nothing to do with Mega Man himself", but with "his rivals, his enemies, and their abilities." IGN agreed with his dependency on support characters, saying Zero is "cooler than Mega Man". Den of Geek listed Mega Man's incarnation from Street Fighter X Tekken as the 15th best cameo in fighting game history due to how it represented Capcom's lack of interest in featuring other games as of 2012, as well as the apparent self-mockery of it due to Mega Man's poor characterization. Destructoid described this Mega Man as "legit" stating it was "an unexpected and interesting creative decision by [Capcom] using this version of Mega Man to represent them in what may be one of their biggest games of 2012". Jeremy Parish of Polygon ranked 73 fighters from Super Smash Bros. Ultimate "from garbage to glorious", placing Mega Man at 23rd, stating that "most Smash Bros. brawlers are weirdos who probably don’t even register as human. Even if Mega Man’s presence here goes against his basic programming, it’s great to see him reunited with his old pals Simon and Pit, just like in the Captain N days." Gavin Jasper of Den of Geek ranked Mega Man as 10th on his list of Super Smash Bros. Ultimate characters, stating "The games still hold up and the Blue Bomber remains one of video games’ greatest icons. Including him in Smash is a no-brainer, but it’s also rather important."

References

Anthropomorphic video game characters
Capcom protagonists
Child characters in video games
Child superheroes
Corporate mascots
Fictional androids
Male characters in advertising
Male characters in video games
Mega Man characters
Robot characters in video games
Robot superheroes
Super Smash Bros. fighters
Superhero television characters
Television superheroes
Video game characters introduced in 1987
Video game characters who can teleport
Video game mascots
Video game superheroes